= Santo Antônio, Rio Grande do Sul =

Santo Antônio
- Neighbourhood (bairro)
- Etymology: Named after the Church of Santo Antônio (Saint Anthony)
- Interactive map of Santo Antônio
- Location in Rio Grande do Sul Santo Antônio (Brazil)
- Coordinates: 30°03′36″S 51°12′14″W
- Country: Brazil
- State: Rio Grande do Sul
- Municipality: Porto Alegre
- Created: 7 December 1959 (Law 2022)
- Time zone: UTC−3 (BRT)
- Area code: 51

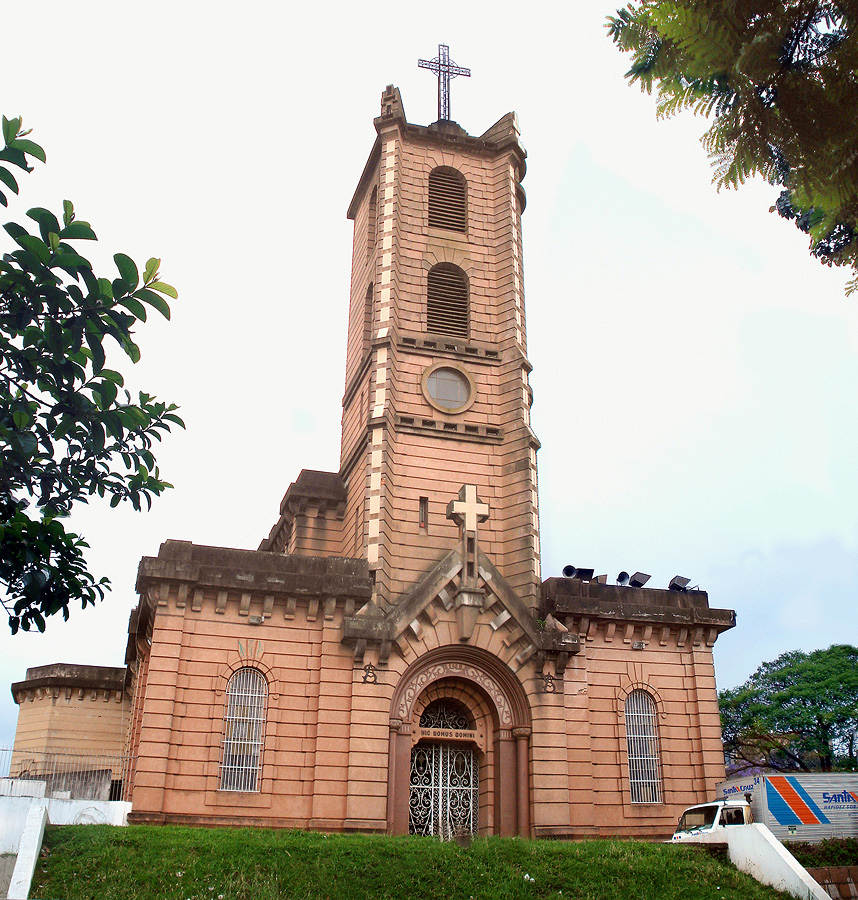
Igreja de Santo Antônio.

Santo Antônio is a neighbourhood (bairro) in the city of Porto Alegre, the state capital of Rio Grande do Sul, in Brazil. It was created by Law 2022 from December 7, 1959.
